Dupoint-Lapeer Airport is a public use airport located  northeast of Lapeer in Mayfield Township, Lapeer County, Michigan. The airport is publicly owned by the township.

The Civil Air Patrol operates a cadet program at the airport that teaches students to fly using gliders. The chapter participates in a variety of events besides flight training to keep cadets engaged with the program.

History
DuPont-Lapeer Airport was built soon after World War II ended. It was purchased by the G. B. DuPont Company in 1956, who subsequently sold it to Mayfield Township in 1996.

The airport was initially funded through grants from the Federal Aviation Administration (FAA) and local funds, many of which were provided by the DuPont Company. It is currently self-sustaining using fees from hangar rentals, fuel sales, and renting land to farmers for crop growth.

Facilities and aircraft
The airport has two runways.

A fixed-base operator (FBO) is based on the field to provide fuel for local and transient aircraft. Restrooms, conference rooms, a lounge, and a weather briefing station are also available. The FBO is an FAA-certified repair station and offers aircraft rental.

The airport has hangar space for up to 60 based aircraft.

For the 12-month period ending December 31, 2021, the airport averaged 43 aircraft operations per day, or about 15,500 per year. It is all general aviation. For the same time period, there were 51 aircraft based on the field, all single-engine airplanes.

References 

Airports in Michigan
Airports established in the 1940s
Buildings and structures in Lapeer County, Michigan
Transportation in Lapeer County, Michigan